Charles Thomas Butler (May 12, 1906 – May 10, 1964) was an American Major League Baseball pitcher. In 1 career game, he had a 0–0 record with a 9.00 ERA. He batted right and threw left-handed.

Butler was born in Green Cove Springs, Florida, and died in Brunswick, Georgia, at the age of 57.

External links

1906 births
1964 deaths
Philadelphia Phillies players
Baseball players from Florida
People from Green Cove Springs, Florida
Albany Senators players
Charlotte Hornets (baseball) players
Columbia Senators players
Montreal Royals players
Wilmington Pirates players
Burials at Ferncliff Cemetery